Press Institute of Bangladesh or PIB is an autonomous national research institute that provides training to Journalists and carries out research on mass media and journalism in Bangladesh and is located in Dhaka, Bangladesh.  Zafar Wazed is the present Director General of the institute.

History
The institute was established in 1976 through the publication of a government gazette notification. As of 2011 the institute has organised 721 training sessions with over 18,000 participants.

References

Government agencies of Bangladesh
1976 establishments in Bangladesh
Mass media in Bangladesh